The Scotland Rugby League is the governing body for rugby league football in Scotland. It administers the Scotland national rugby league teams.

The Scotland Division of the Rugby League Conference serves as the domestic competition. It was founded with five teams in 1997 and was administered by Scotland Rugby League. It has been administered by the Rugby League Conference since 2006 and became full members of the Conference in 2007.

Competitions

Scottish National Team

The Scotland national rugby league team represent Scotland in international rugby league football tournaments. and are nicknamed The Bravehearts. Following the break-up of the Great Britain team in 2008, Scottish players play solely for Scotland, apart from occasional Southern Hemisphere tours, for which the Great Britain team is expected to be revived.

The team formally began in 1995, making them the newest international rugby league team in Great Britain. In their first match they played Ireland, losing narrowly. Since then, Ireland has become the team's main rival, the two teams having played each other many times in their short histories. Scotland have also played the United States, France and Russia amongst others. In 2000 they qualified for their first ever World Cup, but failed to make an impact, losing all three of their group matches; however, their biggest losing margin was just 12 points. In 2008 they beat Wales over two matches to qualify for the 2008 World Cup.

In 2016, Scotland competed at their first every Rugby League Four Nations. They competed against Australia, New Zealand and traditional rivals England.

Scotland became the first nation outside of the three traditionally strongest Rugby League nations to take a competition point with their 18-18 draw against New Zealand in Workington. Becoming the first nation to take a competition point off a top 3 nation in a major tournament since 1975.

Scotlands other results were a 12-54 loss to Australia and a galant 12-38 loss to England.

Honours
Rugby League European Cup: 2014 Winners

The Board
The SRL board consists of the following:
Chairman: Keith Hogg
Operations Director: Ollie Cruikshank
Finance Director: Allan Cameron
Governance Director: Hilary Smith-Milne
Commercial Director: Rob Moffat
Non-Exec Director: Bob Baxendale
Head of Development: Vacant
Head of Player Pathways: Vacant
Head of Wheelchair Rugby League: Vacant
Club Representative: Vacant

See also

Rugby league in Scotland

References

External links

 
Rugby league
Rugby league governing bodies in Europe
Sports organizations established in 1994